The Central American Championships in Athletics is an athletics event for athletes which began in 1958.  Records are set by athletes who are representing one of the CADICA's member states.  The following list of records is assembled from the CADICA website.

Men's records

Women's records

See also
List of North, Central American and Caribbean records in athletics

References

External links

Records
Central American Championships